Deiradiotae or Deiradiotai was a deme of ancient Attica, originally of the phyle of Leontis, but between 307/6 BCE to 201/0 BCE of the phyle of Antigonis, sending two delegates to the  Boule. 

Its site is tentatively located near modern el:Daskalio.

References

Populated places in ancient Attica
Former populated places in Greece
Demoi